Moliden is a locality situated in Örnsköldsvik Municipality, Västernorrland County, Sweden with 300 inhabitants in 2010. Moliden is close to Gottne, Själevad, Bredbyn and Billsta.

References 

Populated places in Örnsköldsvik Municipality
Ångermanland